Eva Paskuy ( Baldeweg, born 14 November 1948) is a former East German handball player, born in Dresden, who competed in the 1976 Summer Olympics.

In 1976 she won the silver medal with the East German team. She played all five matches.

References

External links
profile

1948 births
Living people
Sportspeople from Dresden 
German female handball players
Handball players at the 1976 Summer Olympics
Olympic handball players of East Germany
Olympic silver medalists for East Germany
Olympic medalists in handball
Medalists at the 1976 Summer Olympics